Sussundenga District is a district of Manica Province in western Mozambique. The principal town is Sussundenga. The district is located in the center of the province, and borders with Manica District in the north, Gondola District in the northeast, Buzi District of Sofala Province in the east, Chibabava District of Sofala Province in the southeast, Mossurize District in the south, and with Zimbabwe in the west. It has a population of 129,851 as of 2007.

Geography
The Chimanimani Mountains occupy the western portion of the district, along the border with Zimbabwe. Chimanimani National Reserve protects the Mozambican portion of the range.

The main rivers in the district are the Revué River, the Munhinga River, the Mussapa River, and the Lucite River, which are tributaries of the Buzi River. A number of rivers are seasonal and only flow during the rainy season.

Demographics
As of 2005, 47% of the population of the district was younger than 15 years. 27% did speak Portuguese. The most common mothertongue is Chitwe language. 73% were analphabetic, mostly women.

Administrative divisions
The district is divided into four postos, Sussundenga (four localities), Dombé (four localities), Muhoa (two localities), and Rotanda (two localities).

Economy
2% of the households in the district have access to electricity.

Agriculture
In the district, there are 20,000 farms which have on average  of land. The main agricultural products are corn, cassava, cowpea, peanut, sorghum, sweet potato, and rice.

Transportation
There is a road network in the district which includes the national road EN216 connecting Chimoio and Mossuriz. EN216 passes Sussundenga.

References

Districts in Manica Province